Black Sea Arena is an indoor arena located on the coast of the Black Sea in Shekvetili, Guria, Georgia, some 45 km north of Batumi, the country's second largest city. The venue, designed by the architects from the German company Drei Architekten, is the largest open concert hall in the Caucasus. The auditorium has a capacity of 10,000 seats in circular grandstands.

The American singer-songwriter Christina Aguilera performed at the official opening of the Black Sea Arena on July 30, 2016.  Since then it has hosted various events, including the concerts of rock bands Aerosmith and Scorpions, Elton John, The Black Eyed Peas, Thirty Seconds to Mars, Jessie J, Vanessa Mae, CeeLo Green and Ennio Morricone. Numerous concerts featuring Georgian stars were also held at Black Sea Arena.

Concerts

Notes

References

External links

Indoor arenas in Georgia (country)
Music venues in Georgia (country)
Buildings and structures in Guria
Music venues completed in 2016
2016 establishments in Georgia (country)